St Andrew's Enfield is a Church of England church in Enfield, London, and the original parish church of Enfield. It is a grade II* listed building with Historic England.

History

The first written evidence of there being a Parish Church in Enfield dates from 1136 when St Andrew's, along with a number of other neighbouring parishes, was endowed to the Monastery at Walden in Essex, now Saffron Walden. In 1190, Abbot Reginald of Walden appointed Robertus to serve as the first Vicar of Enfield.

The earliest known parts of St Andrew's date from the years immediately following the appointment of Robertus. Part of the east wall of the church and the south wall of the sanctuary date from this period, including the lancet-shaped unglazed window in the south wall of the sanctuary, opening today into the Artillery Chapel. Originally, of course, this south wall formed the external wall of the church and there are even traces in this window aperture of the sockets for the iron framework of the glass.
 
The 14th century saw much restoration and major enlargements to the church, including the construction of the north and south aisles (although the south aisle was much lower than the north, being raised to its present height only in 1824). The church tower is also 14th century, although much restored and altered in later years. The arches in the nave date from this same period. The pitch pine pews were installed after much argument and dispute in 1853; the oak clergy and choir stalls in 1908 as a memorial to Prebendary Hodson, Vicar of Enfield from 1870 - 1904, and the painting over the chancel arch in 1923 as a memorial to the men of Enfield who died in the First World War.

A curious epitaph in the churchyard to Thomas Carter, who died in 1742, reads:

Gallery

References

External links

Saint Andrew
14th-century church buildings in England
Diocese of London
Grade II* listed churches in London
Saint Andrew
Grade II* listed monuments and memorials
Enfield, London
History of the London Borough of Enfield
World War I memorials in England